James Wilson Henderson (August 15, 1817 – August 30, 1880) was the fourth Governor of Texas from November 23, 1853 to December 21, 1853.

Biography
Born on August 15, 1817 in Sumner County, Tennessee, Henderson moved to Texas when he was 19 to join the struggle for independence, but he arrived too late to participate. He settled in Harris County and became the county surveyor, also studying law. In 1842, he enlisted in the Somervelle Expedition.

In 1843, he was elected to the Texas House of Representatives, and in 1847, became Speaker of the House. He was elected Lieutenant Governor on August 4, 1851 and was inaugurated on December 21. He became the fourth Governor of Texas on November 23, 1853 upon the resignation of his predecessor, Peter Hansborough Bell.

Henderson served the last 28 days of Bell's term of office when Bell resigned to take the vacant seat in the United States Congress from the Western District of Texas.

During the Civil War, he joined the Confederate Army as a captain.

James W. Henderson died on August 30, 1880 at the age of 63 in Houston and was buried in Glenwood Cemetery.

External links

"Portraits of Texas Governors". Texas State Library and Archives Commission

References

1817 births
1880 deaths
Burials at Glenwood Cemetery (Houston, Texas)
Lieutenant Governors of Texas
Democratic Party governors of Texas
Speakers of the Texas House of Representatives
Democratic Party members of the Texas House of Representatives
19th-century American politicians